Matthew Tyler Murphy (December 29, 1929 – June 15, 2018), known as Matt "Guitar" Murphy, was an American blues guitarist. He was associated with Memphis Slim, The Blues Brothers and Howlin' Wolf.

Early life
Murphy was born in Sunflower, Mississippi, and was educated in Memphis, Tennessee, where his father worked at the Peabody Hotel. Murphy learned to play guitar when he was a child.

Career
In 1948, Murphy moved to Chicago, where he joined the Howlin' Wolf Band, which at the time featured Little Junior Parker. In 1952, Murphy recorded with Little Junior Parker and Ike Turner, resulting in the release, “You’re My Angel”/“Bad Women, Bad Whiskey”(Modern 864), credited to Little Junior Parker and the Blue Flames.

Murphy worked often with Memphis Slim, including on his debut album At the Gate of Horn (1959). Murphy recorded two albums and many singles with Chuck Berry and was also featured in works by Koko Taylor, Sonny Boy Williamson II, Buddy Guy, Etta James, and Otis Rush. He also performed with Willie Dixon. Freddie King is said to have once admitted that he based his "Hide Away" (1960) on Murphy's playing.

He gave a memorable performance in 1963 on the American Folk Blues Festival tour of Europe with his "Matt's Guitar Boogie".  

In the 1970s, Murphy associated with harmonica player James Cotton, recording over six albums. Dan Aykroyd and John Belushi attended one of their performances and subsequently asked Murphy to join the touring band of The Blues Brothers. Murphy appeared in the films The Blues Brothers (1980) and Blues Brothers 2000 (1998), playing the husband of Aretha Franklin. He performed with the Blues Brothers Band until the early 2000s.

Murphy was inducted into the Blues Hall of Fame in 2012.

Equipment
Murphy's first signature guitar was manufactured by Cort Guitars. He visited the Cort factory in Korea in 1998, and later that year the MGM-1 was introduced. Most of these guitars have a sunburst or honey finish. They are made of agathis, with a mahogany neck, and have two humbuckers and single volume and tone controls. This model was produced until 2006; 78 were sold, according to factory numbers. In 2011, Matt started playing Delaney Guitars and had a signature model made by Mike Delaney which he played until he died in 2018.

Personal life and death 
Murphy suffered a stroke in the summer of 2002, but returned to perform a few years later. In 2011, he married Kathy Hemrick in a private ceremony in South Miami, Florida. A month later they celebrated with an "open to the public" reception at Fort Lauderdale, Florida, which also doubled as a release party for the CD Last Call. 

Murphy resided in Miami until he died from a heart attack on June 15, 2018, at age 88. His passing was first announced on Facebook by his nephew Floyd Murphy Jr., who performed alongside his uncle.

Solo discography

Way Down South (1990)

Way Down South was Murphy's debut solo album, first released in 1990 with Discovery. It included contributions by his brother Floyd, and remained his most critically acclaimed solo project.

The Blues Don't Bother Me! (1996)

The Blues Don't Bother Me! was Murphy's second solo album, and the first released with Roesch Records. His nephew, Floyd Murphy, Jr. played drums and co-composed two songs, and the label's namesake and exec producer, Joe Roesch, played drums on one song. Reception was more mixed. The title recording, The Blues Don't Bother Me, was licensed by Universal Records as the second track on the Blues Brothers 2000 Original Motion Picture Soundtrack which earned the RIAA Certified Gold Award of 500,000 units sold on March 16, 1998.

Lucky Charm (2000)

Lucky Charm was Murphy's third solo album, first released in 2000 with Roesch. It included contributions by his fellow Blues Brothers musicians Lou Marini and Alan Rubin, credited as The Blues Brothers Horns.

Track listing

Personnel
 Matt "Guitar" Murphycomposer, primary artist, bass, guitar, guitar (electric), vocals
 Sax Gordonguest artist, saxophone, vocals (background)
 The Blues Brothers Hornshorn
 Birch Johnsontrombone
 Alan Rubintrumpet
 Lou Marinihorn section, saxophone
 Floyd Murphy, Jr.drums, guitar, vocals (background)
 Leon Pendarviskeyboards, organ, vocals
 Tom Barneybass
 Scott Spraybass
 Howard Eldridgevocals
 David Fostervocals (background)
 Sable Roeschvocals (background)
 Vic Steffensvocals (background)
 Matt "Guitar" Murphyproducer
 Sable Roeschexecutive producer, art direction, vocals (background)
 Joe Roeschexecutive producer, art direction, mixing, photography, vocals (background)
 Robert Saubercover painting, design
 Vic Steffensengineer, mixing

Last Call (2010)
Last Call was Murphy's last solo album, released in 2010 with Bluzpik.

Appearances
With Sonny Boy Williamson
The Real Folk Blues (Chess, 1947-64 [1966])

See also
List of Chicago blues musicians
List of guitarists by genre
Long Beach Blues Festival
San Francisco Blues Festival

References

External links

Interview with Murphy at tomguerra.com

1929 births
2018 deaths
20th-century African-American musicians
20th-century American guitarists
American blues guitarists
African-American male guitarists
Blues musicians from Mississippi
People from Sunflower, Mississippi
The Blues Brothers members
Guitarists from Mississippi